In Gaelic football, the All-Ireland Senior Football Championship Final, the deciding match of the All-Ireland Senior Football Championship competition, is considered the highest honour for referees to be appointed to officiate.

The most recent final (2022) was refereed by Sean Hurson, with Paddy Neilan on standby; Barry Cassidy as linesman; Sean Laverty on sideline; and two umpires from Ardboe and one each from Clonoe and Moortown. The 2021 All-Ireland Senior Football Championship Final was refereed by Joe McQuillan, with David Gough on standby; Brendan Cawley as linesman; Ciaran Brannigan on sideline; and two umpires from Kill Shamrocks and one each from Drumalee and Killygarry. The 2019 All-Ireland Senior Football Championship Final was refereed by David Gough, with Conor Lane on standby; Barry Cassidy as linesman.

Selection
According to The Irish Times, the referee is often "centre stage" during All-Ireland SFC finals. 

Men who referee a final that ends in a draw cannot also referee the replay. This rule was highlighted in 2019, when David Gough — thought by consensus to have had a good game — was replaced by Conor Lane for the replay. Colm O'Rourke in the Sunday Independent column, "The GAA's view that the referee of a drawn game cannot take the replay defies common sense and logic. Why disqualify a referee when he has done a good job? If the referee is not up to it then certainly he should be left off, but when there is almost universal agreement that he is the best referee in the country then give him all the big games and replays too. The players want the best referees".

Brian White was the first to benefit from the rule change when he got to referee the 2000 replay.

Referees are chosen by the Gaelic Athletic Association (GAA) for their impartiality and their assessed performance scores over that championship season. A clue to the identity of the final referee may be found among those chosen to referee All-Ireland quarter-finals. In recent years, a referee who has overseen an All-Ireland SFC semi-final is never chosen for the final. However, he has tended to have refereed a quarter-final.

A referee who has officiated at one of the semi-finals is traditionally overlooked when deciding the referee for the same year's final.

When the decision is made, the identity of the referee chosen is revealed following the All-Ireland SFC semi-finals and ahead of the final. A period of media attention may ensue, sometimes even before the announcement has been made.

Traditions
On the day, the referee is introduced to the President of Ireland ahead of the game.

The referee receives a Celtic cross for each final he officiates.

Referees

Pre-1928

1928 to 1969: Introduction of the Sam Maguire Cup

1970 to 2000

2001 to present

Referees with more than one final
 = referee still active at inter-county level

 James Byrne did 1923, a Jim Byrne did 1930?
 J Flaherty (Offaly) did 1939, then an MJ Flaherty (Offaly) did 1948?
 Pat Dunphy (1922) has the distinction of also taking charge of the 1922 All-Ireland Senior Hurling Championship Final in the same year.
 John Dowling (1960) has the distinction of also taking charge of the 1960 All-Ireland Senior Hurling Championship Final in the same year.
 Jimmy Hatton (1966) has the distinction of also taking charge of the 1966 All-Ireland Senior Hurling Championship Final in the same year.

See also
 FA Cup Final referees, the closest the English have

References